Veronica Loretta "Roni" Stoneman (born May 5, 1938) is a noted bluegrass banjo player and comedian widely known as a cast member on the country music show Hee Haw.  She is the youngest daughter of Ernest V. "Pop" Stoneman, patriarch of the Stoneman Family, one of the most famous family groups in early country music. She is the second-youngest of Stoneman's 23 children, and one of the 13 who survived to adulthood.

Early life
Fourteen years before Roni was born, her father, Ernest "Pop" Stoneman, was one of the first-ever country musicians to make a career of recording country music, culminating in his hit 1924 song "The Sinking of the Titanic", which became the first-ever million-selling country-music record.  Stoneman enjoyed a lucrative career until he lost everything during the Great Depression.  It wasn't until 1956 after a winning appearance on a quiz show that Pop resumed his music career, starting a family band with his wife Hattie and some of their children.  Roni had learned to play banjo at a young age and in 1957 joined her family in the band.  They won on Arthur Godfrey's Talent Scouts and made many appearances on other TV shows of the day.  The Stonemans became a very popular touring act, performing at the White House, the Smithsonian, and in 1962 on the Grand Ole Opry.  They even hosted their own TV series, Those Stonemans, from 1966 to 1968, during which time they won the CMA's "Vocal Group of the Year" award in 1967.

Solo career
After Pop's death in 1968, 30-year-old Roni, already a virtuoso banjo player, decided to pursue a solo career.  She eventually reached a much wider audience in the 70s when she joined the cast of the very popular country music show Hee Haw.  But while she occasionally picked banjo and sang on the show, it was her comedic talents that garnered more attention; her most prominent character was that of Ida Lee Nagger, which she initially performed in brief sketches with castmate Gordie Tapp as her husband LaVern.  Roni became so identified with the character of Ida Lee that she would also do other skits in character, including the classic "Pfft! You Were Gone!" song.  Later in the series run, Ida Lee had adopted a Sadie Hawkins-style persona of a homely spinster, particularly in Hee Haws "Honky Tonk" sketch, during which she would be chasing numerous men around wielding a large butterfly net.

As of 2020, Roni Stoneman and her older sister, mandolinist Donna Stoneman, continued to perform, sometimes together.  Roni and Donna are the last two surviving members of the Stoneman Family band, their even older autoharpist sister Patsy Stoneman having died in 2015.  Roni entertained at numerous state and county fairs, and relatively recent appearances also included the UCLA Folk Festival, the Florida State Fair, and the International Sport Show in Canada.

References

1938 births
American television actresses
American banjoists
American bluegrass musicians
American women comedians
Living people
21st-century American women